Bitritto is a town and comune in the Metropolitan City of Bari, Apulia, in southern Italy.

References

External links

 Commune of Bitritto 

Cities and towns in Apulia